The 1993 Philippine Basketball Association (PBA) All-Filipino Cup was the first conference of the 1993 PBA season. It started on February 28 and ended on May 18, 1993. The tournament is an All-Filipino format, which doesn't require an import or a pure-foreign player for each team.

Format
The following format will be observed for the duration of the conference:
The teams were divided into 2 groups.

Group A:
Coney Island Ice Cream Stars
San Miguel Beermen
Shell Rimula X
Sta. Lucia Realtors

Group B:
Alaska Milkmen
Ginebra San Miguel
7-Up Uncolas
Swift Mighty Meaty Hotdogs

Teams in a group will play against each other twice and against teams in the other group once; 10 games per team; Teams are then seeded by basis on win–loss records. Ties are broken among point differentials of the tied teams. Standings will be determined in one league table; teams do not qualify by basis of groupings.
 The top five teams after the eliminations will advance to the quarterfinals.
 Quarterfinals will be a single round robin affairs with the remaining five teams. The team with the worst record will be eliminated.
 The four remaining teams will have a best of five semifinal series.
SF1: #1 vs. #4
SF2: #2 vs. #3
Best-of-five third-place playoff: losers of the semifinals
Best-of-seven finals: winners of the semifinals

Elimination round

Team standings

Quarterfinals

Team standings

Results

Bracket

Semifinals

(1) San Miguel vs. (4) Sta. Lucia

The realtors completed a stirring comeback from 15 points down in the final five minutes, rookie Max Delantes soared high for a tip-in and then glided in for a fastbreaking layup with a foul from Ato Agustin in the last 20 seconds.

Hector Calma, Ato Agustin and Allan Caidic took turns in keeping the beermen intact in the face of the realtors' rally from deficits of as many as 12 points.

Allan Caidic sizzled with 31 of his 37 points in the second half, the triggerman unloaded three triples in the third quarter that saw the beermen taking a 71–61 lead from a 43-all count at halftime.

(2) Swift vs. (3) Coney Island

Game canceled due to a brownout experienced in the venue.

Coney Island took their first sizeable lead of 10 points, 72–62, going into the final period. Alvin Patrimonio pumped in 22 of his 31 points in the second half.

Alvin Patrimonio knocked in an off-balance jumper with 36.8 seconds left, giving the stars a 100–97 cushion in the extension period, and completed his heroics by tapping the ball from a driving Nelson Asaytono with six seconds remaining. The stars fell by as many as 20 points in the third period.

Dindo Pumaren scored six of Coney Island's last eight points in the second overtime as the Stars repulses the Mighty Meaties, despite the absence of Abe King, who was serving a one-game suspension, and Alvin Patrimonio, who was ejected with still nine minutes left in the second quarter after figuring in a scuffle with Swift forward Eric Reyes.

Third place playoffs

Finals

References

External links
 PBA.ph

All-Filipino Cup
PBA Philippine Cup